Agony is the sixth studio album by Chicago Celtic punk band The Tossers.  It was released on March 7, 2007 by Victory Records.  It is their second release on the label.

Track listing

 "Never Enough" – 3:08
 "Pub And Culture" – 2:58
 "Shade" – 1:54
 "Did It All For You" – 1:51
 "The Sheep In The Boots" – 3:26
 "Not Forgotten" – 3:31
 "Siobhan" – 2:08
 "Traps And Ultimatums" – 2:35
 "Leopardstown Races" – 5:44
 "Claddagh" – 1:55
 "Where Ya Been Johnny?" – 2:30
 "Not Alone" – 3:44
 "Political Scum" – 2:55
 "Romany" – 1:44
 "Movin' On" – 3:41
 "The Nut House" – 2:29
 "Be" – 2:15

External links 
E-Card

References 

The Tossers albums
2007 albums
Victory Records albums